Gloria de los Ángeles Treviño Ruiz (born February 15, 1968), known as Gloria Trevi, is a Mexican singer, songwriter, dancer, actress, television hostess, music video director and businesswoman known as "The Supreme Diva of Mexican Pop".

Early life
Born in Monterrey, Nuevo León, Mexico, Gloria Trevi left Monterrey for Mexico City to pursue her music career.

Career

1985–1995: Early success and initial breakout
In 1985, Trevi became a member of a short-lived girl group named Boquitas Pintadas. After the group broke up in 1988, she approached  for the production of her first solo album, ¿Qué Hago Aquí? (What Am I Doing Here?), which was released in 1989 and scored a number one hit across Latin America, "Dr. Psiquiatra". Trevi was often dubbed as the Madonna of Mexico.

In 1991, Trevi released her second album, Tu Ángel de la Guarda (Your Guardian Angel), which is widely regarded as one of her best albums. "Pelo Suelto", the lead single from the album, was a worldwide success, reaching number 1 in several Latin America countries and in Spain. Billboard magazine included Tu Angel de la Guarda in their list of greatest Latin albums of all time. Her third album, Me Siento Tan Sola (I Feel So Lonely), was released in 1992 garnering another hit, "Zapatos Viejos". Trevi starred in the film of the same name in 1993. In 1994, she released two singles, "El Recuento De Los Daños" and "La Papa Sin Catsup", from her fourth studio album Más Turbada Que Nunca (More Turbulent than Ever). Both singles reigned the Billboard Top Latin Albums. In December 1995, Trevi released her final studio album of the decade, and her final album produced by Andrade, Si Me Llevas Contigo (If You Take Me with You). The album produced two moderate hits, "Ella Que Nunca Fue Ella" ("She Who Never Was Herself") and "Si Me Llevas Contigo" ("If You Take Me with You"). On March 13, 1996, Trevi announced that she would retire to care for Andrade during his cancer battle. She offered her last two concerts at the National Auditorium, March 16 and 17.

2004–present: Post-arrest career and continued success

Following her release, Trevi released her sixth studio album, Como Nace el Universo ("How the Universe was Born"). The album was preceded by the moderate hit "En el Medio de la Tempestad" ("In the Midst of the Storm"). While her sixth record was well-received as her comeback, her seventh studio album Una Rosa Blu was a massive critical and commercial success. Released in 2007, the album produced several successful singles included "Psicofonia, Pruebamelo" ("Prove it to Me"), "El Favor de la Soledad" ("The Favor of Solitude"), "Cinco Minutos" ("Five Minutes"), and "Todos Me Miran" ("Everyone Looks at Me"). During award season, Trevi won Female Artist of the Year at the coveted Premio Lo Nuestro Awards and Female Airplay Song of the Year for "Cinco Minutos" at the Billboard Music Awards. Producer Sergio George earned a nomination at the Latin Grammy for producer of the year for his work on Una Rosa Blu In 2010, Trevi released her eighth, self-titled studio album Gloria. The album included the successful singles "Vestida de Azucar" ("Dressed in Sugar"), "Fuego con Fuego" ("Fire with Fire"), "Me Rio de Ti" ("I Laugh at You"), "La Noche" ("The Night"), and "Esa Hembra es Mala" ("That Female is Evil"). The latter was used as the theme song for the telenovela Teresa.

In 2013, Trevi released her tenth studio album De Pelicula. The album produced the single "No Querias Lastimarme" ("You Didn't Want to Hurt Me"), which was a critical and massive success. The song reached the top ten of the Latin Billboard charts and topped the charts of several Latin American countries. In 2015, Trevi embarked on a new passion project, which would become her eleventh studio album, El Amor. The concept album included covers of popular Latin American love ballads, including previous songs from Trevi's catalog as well as original work. Trevi had two alter-egos for the album, Mr. Trevi and Mrs. Gloria. The album debuted at the top of the Billboard charts and produced two successful singles, "Como Yo Te Amo" ("How I Love You") and "Las Pequeñas Cosas" ("The Little Things"). In 2017, Trevi collaborated with fellow Mexican artist Alejandra Guzmán for the album Versus. The album included two singles, "Cuando un Hombre te Enamora" and "Mas Buena". The two singers embarked on the Versus World Tour during summer and fall 2017.

Personal life
Trevi married Armando Gómez, a lawyer, in 2009. She now lives in McAllen, Texas, with Gómez and her two sons. Trevi received the BMI President's Award on March 2, 2016, at the 23rd BMI Latin Awards for her impact on Latin pop.

Arrest
In 2000, Trevi, Andrade, and backup singer Maria Raquenel Portillo were arrested in Rio de Janeiro, Brazil, on charges of corrupting minors. A year later, while in prison, Trevi announced that she was pregnant. The father was Andrade, according to DNA tests by Brazilian authorities (Trevi and her defense claimed that the results of the DNA test had been doctored). Trevi was cleared of the charges in 2004, due to lack of evidence, after spending four years and eight months in prison.

Discography

 ¿Qué Hago Aquí? (1989)
 Tu Ángel de la Guarda (1991)
 Me Siento Tan Sola (1992)
 Más Turbada Que Nunca (1994)
 Si Me Llevas Contigo (1995)
 Cómo Nace el Universo (2004)
 Una Rosa Blu (2007)
 Gloria (2011)
 De Película (2013)
 El Amor (2015)
 Versus (with Alejandra Guzmán) (2017)
Diosa de la Noche (2019)
Isla Divina (2022)

Tours
 Trevolución (2005–2006)
 Una Rosa Blu Tour (2009–2010)
 Gloria Tour (2011-2012)
 Agárrate Tour (2013–2014)
 De Película Tour (2014–2015)
 El Amor Tour (2015-2016)
 Versus Tour with Alejandra Guzmán (2017–18)
 Diosa de la Noche Tour (2019)
 Isla Divina World Tour (2022)

Filmography

References

External links

 Former official website
 Universal Music Latin Entertainment | Gloria Trevi 
 The New York Times
 Gloria Trevi section on Univision.com 
 Gloria Trevi Interview

1968 births
Living people
Latin music songwriters
Latin pop singers
Women in Latin music
Mexican women pop singers
Mexican women singer-songwriters
Mexican singer-songwriters
Mexican film actresses
Mexican people of Spanish-Jewish descent
Mexican telenovela actresses
Mexican television presenters
Singers from Monterrey
Universal Music Latin Entertainment artists
Mexican women television presenters
Mexican LGBT rights activists